Gooli is a 2008 Indian Kannada-language action film, directed by P. Sathya. It stars Sudeep, Mamta Mohandas in lead roles. The film is produced by Ramu under the banner Ramu Enterprises and music is by Anoop Seelin. The film was later dubbed into Hindi as Sabse Bada Mawali in 2009 and into Tamil as Korukkupettai Kooli in 2012.

Plot 
The central character Gooli (Sudeep), is an uneducated, rude youngster and deadly merciless, cruel rowdy with whom a girl named Ramya (Mamta) accidentally falls in love by seeing his pure and unadulterated heart. Ramya continues to keep in touch with Gooli despite opposition from her family, and although Gooli tries to keep Ramya at a distance, he finds he has also fallen in love with her. They marry but separate shortly afterwards. Later Gooli hears shocking news about the apparent death of Ramya, however, she is not dead but in a mental asylum due to severe brain damage.

Cast 
 Sudeep as Gooli
 Mamta Mohandas as Ramya
 Kishore
 Bhavya
 Rajashekhar
 Yethiraaj
 Sathya
 Rekha V. Kumar

Soundtrack

References

External links 
 
 

2008 films
Films scored by Anoop Seelin
2008 action drama films
Indian action drama films
2008 romantic drama films
Indian romantic action films
2000s Kannada-language films
Indian gangster films
Indian romantic drama films
2000s romantic action films